Malte Richard Friedrich Jaeger (sometimes named in cast lists as Malte Jäger)  (4 July 1911 in Hannover – 10 January 1991 at Ladelund / district of North Friesland) was a German actor, theater director and voice actor.

Early life

Malte Jaeger was the youngest of three children, son of the newspaper publisher Malte Heinrich Gustav Jaeger and his second Metta wife Christine, née Mueller. In 1912, the family moved from Hanover to Hamburg-Altona to, Oelckersallee No. 1. After graduation, Jaeger completed an apprenticeship as a wholesale merchant and attended an acting school. Before starting his acting career, he spent some time working as a journalist, as he already received his first broadcast in 1927 obligation.

Acting career

In 1937, he was engaged at the North-Land Mark Theater in Schleswig, where he made his debut in Ferdinand's tragedy Egmont, by Johann Wolfgang von Goethe. His first production was just there the detective unit 13 Park Street by Axel Ivers. In 1939 he went to 1945 at the State Theater in Berlin. His work in television began in 1939/40 when trying Sender Berlin Hanns driving under castle as a speaker and commentator. In subsequent years, he made a numerous guest appearances in Bremen, Munich, Berlin and Stuttgart.  During this time, while he relocated to Bad Wiessee. In 1952 he returned to Berlin and worked at the Theater am Kurfürstendamm . Aside from acting, he also appeared frequently as a director in appearance. Among his roles at the time include:

Martinius in Cherries for Rome by Hans Hömberg (1940),
Don Caesar in A dispute in Habsburg, by Franz Grillparzer (1942),
Ladvenu in Saint Joan by George Bernard Shaw (1943),
Teacher Gottwald in Hanneles Himmelfahrt''' by Gerhart Hauptmann.

In 1934, he made his film debut, taking on a small role in the feature film The small relatives directed by Hans Deppe. He had to wait three years before getting his next role, mediated by Mathias Wieman. In the film Unternehmen Michael, he played a company commander. The film was directed by Karl Ritter, who was a master of "covert propaganda film". Ritter made two more movies with Jaeger, Pour le Mérite and Legion Condor. Jaeger played the role of the actuary Faber in the notorious Nazi propaganda film Jud Süß (1940) which was directed by Veit Harlan. In most movies, which of course also included entertainment films, he played supporting roles. One of the major roles of Hans Schonath counted in Philharmonic (1944).

His first appearance in film after the war was in 1948 in the movie Via Mala. This movie was filmed in 1944, but was not released until four years later. He also resumed performing on radio (more than 2000 performances, including treasure ) and starting in 1956 he performed on television. There, he played alongside George Lehn starred in the television play Twelve thousand. He was a key player alongside Paul Edwin Roth in The Man Outside by Wolfgang Borchert. In 1960 he starred in the successful TV miniseries Am grünen Strand der Spree, based on the book by Hans Scholz,  In 1967, he played Hans-Joachim Lepsius, one of the main characters in The Reichstag fire trial or in Sand in 1971. As a voice actor, he was dubbed over Montgomery Clift in A Place in the Sun and Guy Decomble in Can't anyone love you...?.

Personal life

In 1949, Jaeger married Elisabeth Susanne Jaeger, née von Ingersleben. In the early sixties, he met his future life partner, Elly Philomena Mary Wolf, with whom he cohabited for 30 years until his death on 10 January 1991.  The cause of his death was an embolism.

Selected filmography
 Unternehmen Michael (1937) as the 2nd Company commanderPour le Mérite (1938) as Lieutenant OverbeckLegion Condor (1939)Target in the Clouds (1939) as the officer
 D III 88 (1939) as the first radio operator
 Congo Express (1939) as Pierre Dufour
 A German Robinson Crusoe (1940) as the officerJud Süss (1940) as Karl Faber
 Sky Hounds (1942) as Senior Troop Leader KillianImmensee (1943) as Jochen
 Via Mala (1945) as Nikolaus
 The Blue Star of the South (1951) as MarcelDaybreak (1954)
 Roses from the South (1954) as the Chief of protocol
 The Man of My Life (1954) as Dr. ReynoldJackboot Mutiny (1955) 
 I'll Carry You in My Arms (1958) as the train clergymanAm grünen Strand der Spree (1960) as Hans-Joachim Lepsius (1964)  (TV series)Schwarz-Rot-Gold (1982) (TV series)Das Erbe der Guldenburgs'' (1987-1990) (TV series)

1911 births
1991 deaths
German male stage actors
Germany articles needing attention
German male film actors
German theatre directors
German male voice actors
Actors from Hanover
20th-century German male actors
Deaths from embolism